Peter Eric McKenzie Wilson (born 15 November 1963) is a former Australian rules footballer who represented  and  in the Australian Football League (AFL). He wore the number 9 guersey.

Recruited to Western Australian powerhouse  from Lynwood, Wilson is best known for his performance in the 1992 Grand Final, played at the Melbourne Cricket Ground, where he kicked two goals, including a famous "over-the-head" kick in the third quarter.

Wilson played 117 games for the Eagles and 54 for the Richmond Tigers in the AFL. Prior to this he played in the West Australian Football League for East Fremantle Football Club, representing the club 101 times (including the 1985 Premiership). Wilson was named All-Australian in 1986 where he played for Australia against Ireland three times in Ireland's first tour of Australia.

He was named in the West Coast Eagles team of the decade in 1996. The number 9 guernsey was later worn by former Eagles captain, Ben Cousins.

After he retired as a player, Wilson became coach of Westar Rules club Swan Districts for the 1998 and 1999 seasons. Late in the 1999 season as Swan Districts’ administration was undergoing numerous personnel changes, feeling the black and whites needed a fully professional coach and that he could not do that job, Wilson resigned his coaching position after having led Swans to seventh and sixth in a nine-club competition.

Statistics

|-
|- style="background-color: #EAEAEA"
! scope="row" style="text-align:center" | 1987
|style="text-align:center;"|
| 5 || 19 || 27 || 16 || 213 || 108 || 321 || 93 || 28 || 1.4 || 0.8 || 11.2 || 5.7 || 16.9 || 4.9 || 1.5 || 6
|-
! scope="row" style="text-align:center" | 1988
|style="text-align:center;"|
| 19 || 16 || 4 || 6 || 229 || 108 || 337 || 76 || 20 || 0.3 || 0.4 || 14.3 || 6.8 || 21.1 || 4.8 || 1.3 || 3
|- style="background-color: #EAEAEA"
! scope="row" style="text-align:center" | 1989
|style="text-align:center;"|
| 19 || 19 || 8 || 6 || 212 || 89 || 301 || 60 || 18 || 0.4 || 0.3 || 11.2 || 4.7 || 15.8 || 3.2 || 0.9 || 0
|-
! scope="row" style="text-align:center" | 1990
|style="text-align:center;"|
| 9 || 19 || 18 || 12 || 244 || 111 || 355 || 66 || 27 || 0.9 || 0.6 || 12.8 || 5.8 || 18.7 || 3.5 || 1.4 || 4
|- style="background-color: #EAEAEA"
! scope="row" style="text-align:center" | 1991
|style="text-align:center;"|
| 9 || 22 || 23 || 23 || 245 || 114 || 359 || 83 || 31 || 1.0 || 1.0 || 11.1 || 5.2 || 16.3 || 3.8 || 1.4 || 1
|-
|style="text-align:center;background:#afe6ba;"|1992†
|style="text-align:center;"|
| 9 || 14 || 15 || 5 || 157 || 77 || 234 || 43 || 28 || 1.1 || 0.4 || 11.2 || 5.5 || 16.7 || 3.1 || 2.0 || 0
|- style="background-color: #EAEAEA"
! scope="row" style="text-align:center" | 1993
|style="text-align:center;"|
| 9 || 22 || 6 || 11 || 284 || 98 || 382 || 81 || 43 || 0.3 || 0.5 || 12.9 || 4.5 || 17.4 || 3.7 || 2.0 || 1
|-
|style="text-align:center;background:#afe6ba;"|1994†
|style="text-align:center;"|
| 9 || 24 || 14 || 19 || 278 || 109 || 387 || 87 || 49 || 0.6 || 0.8 || 11.6 || 4.5 || 16.1 || 3.6 || 2.0 || 3
|- style="background-color: #EAEAEA"
! scope="row" style="text-align:center" | 1995
|style="text-align:center;"|
| 9 || 16 || 8 || 11 || 120 || 65 || 185 || 43 || 26 || 0.5 || 0.7 || 7.5 || 4.1 || 11.6 || 2.7 || 1.6 || 0
|- class="sortbottom"
! colspan=3| Career
! 171
! 123
! 109
! 1982
! 879
! 2861
! 632
! 270
! 0.7
! 0.6
! 11.6
! 5.1
! 16.7
! 3.7
! 1.6
! 18
|}

References

External links
Peter Wilson player profile, West Coast Eagles official website.
Profile at Australian Football

West Coast Eagles players
West Coast Eagles Premiership players
East Fremantle Football Club players
Richmond Football Club players
Swan Districts Football Club coaches
All-Australians (1953–1988)
1963 births
Living people
Australian rules footballers from Western Australia
Western Australian State of Origin players
Australia international rules football team players
Two-time VFL/AFL Premiership players